The men's 400 metres hurdles event at the 2003 Summer Universiade was held in Daegu, South Korea on 27, 28 and 30 August.

Medalists

Results

Heats

Semifinals

Final

References

Results

Athletics at the 2003 Summer Universiade
2003